Martin Mutschmann (9 March 1879 – 14 February 1947) was the Nazi Regional Leader (Gauleiter) of the state of Saxony (Gau Saxony) during the time of the Third Reich.

Early years
Born in Hirschberg on the Saale in the Principality of Reuss-Gera, Germany, Mutschmann moved while he was young with his family to Plauen in Saxony. He served an apprenticeship as an embroiderer and from 1896 to 1901 was employed as a master embroiderer, department head and warehouse director in lace and linen factories in Plauen, Herford and Köln. That was followed by military service from 1901-1903, after which he returned to employment in the Plauen Lace Factory (Plauener Spitzenfabriken). He established his own lace factory, Mutschmann & Eisentraut, in Plauen in October 1907. During World War I, he volunteered for service with Reserve Infantry Regiment 133 and served on the Western Front until he was severely wounded in April 1916. He was awarded the Iron Cross, 2nd class, was discharged from the Army as unfit for field service on 24 December 1916 and resumed the direction of his factory in Plauen.

After the war, he was an early participant in the nationalist and anti-Semitic Deutschvölkischer Schutz und Trutzbund. He joined the National Socialist German Workers Party NSDAP in April 1922, was a founding member of the local branch (Ortsgruppe) in Plauen and made personal donations of capital to the Nazi Party. Mutschmann lost his lace business in the Great Depression, but he continued to solicit donations from other businesses. His fundraising skills found favour with the Nazi Party, and with Adolf Hitler whom he visited in Landsberg prison. During the period when the Nazi Party was banned in the wake of the failed Beer Hall Putsch, Mutschmann succeeded Fritz Tittmann as the leader in Saxony of the National Socialist Freedom Movement (NSFB), a Nazi front organization, taking over at the NSFB party congress, 16-17 August 1924.

Nazi Party career
After the Party was re-established in 1925, Mutschmann was appointed Landesleiter (later Gauleiter) of Saxony on 27 March 1925, maintaining that position until the fall of the Nazi regime. He formally re-enrolled in the Party on 2 June 1925 (Party membership number 35). Generally his political activity concentrated on Saxony rather than on Germany as a whole. Mutschmann was passionately interested in the preservation of Saxon arts and crafts. In September 1930, he was elected to the Reichstag for electoral constituency 30, Chemnitz-Zwickau. Around 1930 he also became the editor of a Nazi daily newspaper, Der Freiheitskampf (The Freedom Struggle). On 15 July 1932 came his appointment as  Landesinspekteur. In this position, he had oversight responsibility for his Gau and that of Thuringia. This was a short-lived initiative by Gregor Strasser to centralize control over the Gaue. However, it was unpopular with the Gauleiters and was repealed on Strasser's fall from power in December 1932. Mutschmann then returned to his Gauleiter position in Saxony.

After the Nazis came to power, Mutschmann was appointed Reichsstatthalter (Reich Governor) of Saxony on 5 May 1933. A passionate hunter, he was the Gaujägermeister (Hunting Master) of Saxony on 10 September 1934. He was often accused of being more interested in his hobby than the welfare of Saxony. On 28 February 1935, he also became the Minister-President of Saxony, displacing his rival, Manfred Freiherr von Killinger, who was purged in the aftermath of the Night of the Long Knives. Mutschmann was one of only a few Gauleiters, to simultaneously occupy both the Reichsstatthalter and Minister-President positions. On 4 September 1935, he was made a member of Karl Frank's Academy for German Law. On 9 November 1937, he was promoted to SA-Obergruppenführer.

Second World War and death
When the war began on 1 September 1939, Mutschmann was appointed the Reich Defense Commissioner for Wehrkreis (Military District) IV that included his Gau as well as Gau Halle-Merseburg, northern Reichsgau Sudetenland and part of Gau Thuringia. On 16 November 1942, the jurisdiction of the Reich Defense Commissioners was changed from the Wehrkreis to the Gau level, and he remained Commissioner only for Gau Saxony. On 25 September 1944, he became the commander of the Nazi Volkssturm forces in Saxony. As Reich Defense Commissioner, Mutschmann had responsibility for air and civil defense measures and was blamed for not adequately preparing for the  bombing of Dresden which occurred from 13-15 February 1945.

On 14 April 1945 he declared Dresden a "fortress" city. On 1 May in Dresden, he insisted that the city go into public mourning after the suicide of German dictator Adolf Hitler on 30 April 1945. On 5 May, Mutschmann falsely announced that a large-scale German offensive on the Eastern Front was about to be launched. On 8 May as Dresden was occupied by the Red Army, Mutschmann fled the city. Moving to Oberwiesenthal and then to Tellerhäuser, he hid out until arrested by police on 17 May. He was displayed in the town square and subjected to public ridicule. Handed over to the NKVD, he was imprisoned in the Lubyanka prison in Moscow, tried by the Military Collegium of the Supreme Court of the Soviet Union and sentenced to death on 30 January 1947. He was shot on 14 February 1947.

Awards and decorations
1914 Iron Cross 2nd Class
1918 Wound Badge in Black, c.1918
1922 Coburg Badge, October 1932
Golden Party Badge, 1933
Anschluss Medal, c.1938
Sudetenland Medal, c.1939
Honour Chevron for the Old Guard
SA Sports Badge

See also
 1925 German presidential election
 1932 German presidential election
 Machtergreifung - "Seizure of Power" - 30 January 1933
 Bombing of Dresden in World War II
 List of Gauleiters
 Ehrenburger Johanngeorgenstadt

Notes

References

External links
 
 

1879 births
1947 deaths
Executed people from Thuringia
Gauleiters
German industrialists
German newspaper editors
Members of the Academy for German Law
Members of the Reichstag of the Weimar Republic
Members of the Reichstag of Nazi Germany
Ministers-President of Saxony
Nazis executed by the Soviet Union by firearm
Nazi Party officials
Nazi Party politicians
People from Saale-Orla-Kreis
People from the Principality of Reuss-Gera
Recipients of the Iron Cross (1914), 2nd class
Sturmabteilung officers
Volkssturm personnel
German embroiderers